Ilinden (Bulgarian/Macedonian Cyrillic: Илинден) or Ilindan (Serbian Cyrillic: Илиндан), meaning "Saint Elijah's Day", may refer to:

Events
 Republic Day (North Macedonia), 2 August

Geographic locations

Bulgaria
 Ilinden, Blagoevgrad Province, a village
 Ilinden, Sofia, an urban municipality

North Macedonia
 Ilinden Municipality
 Ilinden (village)

Association football clubs
 FK Ilinden 1955 Bašino
 FK Ilinden Skopje
 Rockdale Ilinden FC

Other meanings
 Ilinden (memorial), a sculpture in Kruševo, North Macedonia
 Ilinden (novel), by Dimitar Talev
 Ilinden (organization), a Bulgarian revolutionary organization 1921–1947
 Ilinden, a boat built in 1924 which sank in the 2009 Lake Ohrid boat accident
 Ilinden-Preobrazhenie Uprising
 United Macedonian Organization Ilinden–Pirin